Monaro, also known as Maneroo (1856–1858), Monara (1858–1879) and Manaro (1894–1904) is an electoral district of the Legislative Assembly in the Australian state of New South Wales. It is currently represented by Nichole Overall of the National Party.

Monaro is a regional district in the south of the state. It encompasses the Queanbeyan-Palerang Regional Council and Snowy Monaro Regional Council. Its significant population centres include Queanbeyan, Bungendore, Braidwood, Cooma, Bombala, Captains Flat, Nimmitabel, Delegate, Bredbo, Michelago, Berridale, Jindabyne and Adaminaby.

History
The electorate was created in 1856 for the First Parliament under the name Maneroo, derived from an Aboriginal name for the area, now spelt Monaro. It was renamed Monara for the second Parliament in February 1858. The spelling was changed to Monaro from 1877 until 1894. It elected two members between 1880 and 1894.  In 1894, single-member electorates were introduced statewide and part of the electorate, (including Bombala), was absorbed into Eden-Bombala. At this time the spelling was changed to Manaro. The 1903 New South Wales referendum required the number of members of the Legislative Assembly to be reduced from 125 to 90, the district was expanded to include parts of Queanbeyan and the abolished seat of Eden-Bombala and the spelling reverted to Monaro. In 1913, it absorbed much of the electoral district of Queanbeyan, including Queanbeyan, which is its major city.  In 1920, with the introduction of proportional representation, it was absorbed into Goulburn, along with Monaro.  It was recreated in 1927.

Nationals member Nichole Overall made history in 2022 by being elected as the first female representative of the Monaro. Overall's husband was previously mayor of the City of Queanbeyan.

Members for Monaro

Election results

References

Monaro
Monaro
1858 establishments in Australia
Constituencies established in 1858
1920 disestablishments in Australia
Constituencies disestablished in 1920
1927 establishments in Australia
Constituencies established in 1927